Jeanne is a French female name, equivalent to the English Joan, Jane, Jean and several historical figures in English named Joanna. (Feminine forms of John). The names derive from the Old French name Jehanne, which is derived from the Latin name Johannes, itself from the Koine Greek name Ιωαννης Ioannes, ultimately from the Biblical Hebrew name Yochanan, a short form of the name Yehochanan, meaning "Yahweh is Gracious".

Historical people whose name includes Jeanne
 Marie Antoinette Josephe Jeanne
 Jeanne d'Arc (Joan of Arc in English)
 Queen Jeanne I of Navarre
 Queen Jeanne II of Navarre
 Queen Jeanne III of Navarre, also called Jeanne d'Albret
 Jeanne de Flandre (Joanna of Flanders in English)
 Jeanne de Dreux, also called Jeanne de Penthièvre (Joanna of Dreux in English)
 Jeanne de Bar, Countess of Marle and Soissons
 Jeanne of Angoulême
 Queen Jeanne II of Naples (Joanna II of Naples)
 Jeanne de Laval
 Jeanne Du Barry, mistress of King Louis XV of France
 Several princesses of France, Navarre, and Valois

People with the given name Jeanne
 Jeanne Basone (born 1963), American professional wrestler, actress, model, and stuntwoman 
 Jeanne de Bellem (1732/34–fl. 1790), Belgian writer and revolutionary
 Jeanne Bérangère (1864–1938), French actress
Jeanne Black (1937–2014), American country music singer
 Jeanne Calment (1875–1997), French woman with the longest confirmed lifespan in history
 Jeanne Cooper (1928–2013), American actress
 Jeanne Crain (1925–2003), American actress
 Jeanne Dumée (1660–1706), French astronomer
 Jeanne Dunning (born 1960), American photographer
 Jeanne de Flandreysy (1874–1959), French author and literary critic.
 Jeanne Halbwachs (1890-1980), French pacifist, feminist and socialist
 Jeanne Jugan (1792–1879), French nun and saint 
 Marie Sophie Jeanne Laisné (born 1870; year of death unknown), French operatic soprano
 Jeanne Landry (1922–2011), Canadian composer, pianist and teacher
 Jeanne Leblanc (born 1978), Canadian film director and screenwriter
 Jeanne Macherez (1852–1930), French heroine during the World War I; Mayor of Soissons
 Jeanne Moreau (1928–2017), French actress, screenwriter and director
 Jeanne Quinault (1699–1783), French actress, salonist and playwright
 Jeanne Sauvé (1922–1993), Canadian politician
 Jeanne Shaheen (born 1947), American politician
 Jeanne de Tramcourt (1875–1952), French mistress of Prince Wilhelm of Sweden
 Jeanne Tripplehorn (born 1963), American actress
 Jeanne Van Calck (1897–1906), Belgian child who was murdered
 Jeanne You (born 1978), South Korean pianist

Historical people with surname Jeanne
 Marie Antoinette Josephe Jeanne

Fictional people named Jeanne
Jeanne, one of the two main characters in Bernardo Bertolucci's film Last Tango in Paris, played by Maria Schneider
 Dr. Jeanne Benoit, subject of an undercover mission (and potential romantic interest) of Special Agent Tony DiNozzo in the TV show NCIS, played by Scottie Thompson
Jeanne, one of the primary characters of the video game series Bayonetta.
Jeanne, one of the main characters alter egos as Kaitou Jeanne who is the reincarnation of Joan de Arc in the TV show Kaitou Jeanne.
Jeanne, the main character in Jeanne d'Arc the video game.

Other
 Jeanne (crater), a crater on Venus.
 There have been three hurricanes called Hurricane Jeanne: in 1980, 1998 and 2004

See also

 
 
 Jehanne (disambiguation)

French feminine given names